Port au Choix Airport  is  southeast of Port au Choix, Newfoundland and Labrador, Canada.

References

Registered aerodromes in Newfoundland and Labrador